Family Game Night may refer to:

 Family Game Night (TV series), an American television game show
 Hasbro Family Game Night, a video game released by Electronic Arts featuring Hasbro board games
 Family Game Night 2, a sequel to the Hasbro video game and second in the series
 Family Game Night 3, a sequel to the Hasbro video game and third in the series
 Family Game Night 4, a sequel to the Hasbro video game and fourth in the series

See also 

Family game (disambiguation)
Game Night (disambiguation)